is a Japanese television drama series based on the manga series of the same name by Tsugumi Ohba and Takeshi Obata. It was directed by Ryūichi Inomata, who directed the television drama Kaseifu no Mita in 2011, and Ryō Nishimura known by the special version of the 2014 drama Kamen Teacher. The show stars Masataka Kubota as Light Yagami, Kento Yamazaki as L, and Mio Yūki as Near / Mello and focuses on the story of an intelligent yet reserved college student named Light Yagami, who finds a mysterious black notebook known as the Death Note, which can kill anyone whose name is written within its pages. Intrigued with the notebook's god-like abilities, he begins to use the Death Note to kill those whom he sees as unworthy of life, in a bid to change the world into a utopia. Soon, the student/vigilante finds himself pursued by an enigmatic international detective, known only as: "L".

The drama premiered on NTV on July 5, 2015. The first episode received a viewership rating of 16.9% in the Kantō region.

Cast
 Masataka Kubota as Light Yagami: The main protagonist who,  after receiving a Death Note, operates as the vigilante "Kira".
 Kento Yamazaki as L Lawliet: A world-renowned detective set on capturing Kira.
 Jun Fukushima as the voice of Ryuk: A shinigami who serves as the original owner of Light's Death Note.
 Daisaku Nishino as the motion capture actor of Ryuk
 Ayumi Tsunematsu as the voice of Rem: A shinigami who serves as the owner of Misa's Death Note.
 Mio Yūki as Nate River / Mello: A young child with a split-personality serving as L's successor.
 Hinako Sano as Misa Amane: A pop idol who falls in love with Light and serves as one of his accomplices.
 Yutaka Matsushige as Sōichirō Yagami: Light's father and the head of the Kira investigation task force. 
  as Sayu Yagami: Light's sister.
 Gōki Maeda as Tōta Matsuda: A Kira investigation team member.
 Tomohisa Yuge as Shūichi Aizawa: A Kira investigation team member.
 Jirō Satō as Kanzō Mogi: A Kira investigation team member.
 Megumi Seki as Shōko Himura (日村 章子 Himura Shōko) / Halle Lidner: A Kira investigation team member who also works directly with L.
  as Quilish Wammy / Watari: L's assistant and handler.
 Shugo Oshinari as Teru Mikami: A public prosecutor who serves as another one of Light's accomplices.
 Ian Moore as Lind L. Tailor: A convicted criminal waiting on the death row which was used by L as a trap to expose Light/Kira's location.

Episodes

References

External links
  
 
 
 

Japanese drama television series
Death Note
2015 in Japanese television
2015 Japanese television series debuts
2015 Japanese television series endings
Nippon TV dramas
Japanese television dramas based on manga
Vigilante television series